Jeffrey O'Neal Alexander (born January 15, 1965) is a former professional American football running back. He was signed as an undrafted free agent by the Denver Broncos in 1988. He played college football at Southern.

Alexander has also played for the London Monarchs of the World League of American Football and the Dallas Texans of the Arena Football League.

References

1965 births
Living people
Players of American football from Baton Rouge, Louisiana
American football fullbacks
Southern Jaguars football players
Denver Broncos players
London Monarchs players
Dallas Texans (Arena) players